The Ahmadiyya television channel was launched on 1 January 1994 by Muslim Television Ahmadiyya International (MTA), globally-broadcasting and nonprofit satellite television network. This set the foundation for the Islamic television channels available today. In July 2009, ILM Radio launched, making it the first Islamic radio station to launch nationwide in the UK. ILM Radio returning in Bradford and Leeds on DAB Radio with new identity as Marefa Radio. Founded by Qamar Zaman (AKA Shabir Qamar)

In United Kingdom, all the channels are available via Sky and Freesat. Some of these channels are also available in the Republic of Ireland. However, Islamic radio stations have been available on a local basis throughout the UK since the 1990s even though these were on a temporary licence for the Islamic holy month of Ramadan.

Television networks

References

External links
 fatima al zahra international tv
 Islamic Radio Stations
 iPlus TV
 Raah TV
 Zad TV
 iTV SA
 Raham TV                                    
 Voice Of Islam TV
 Al Dawah.tv TV
 ATN Islamic TV
 TV One UK
 BNSW TV
 Paigham TV
 Zainabia Channel
 MTA Muslim TV
 Message TV
 Azaan TV
 Al-Resala
 Al Kawthar TV
 Al Hekmah tv
 Al Watan TV
 Assirat TV
 Al Resalah TV
 Quran Hidayah Urdu
 Alerta TV Channel
 Al Athar TV Channel
 Al Athar TV Channel
 Al Eman TV
 Al - Hebait TV
 Hidayat TV
 Labbaik TV
 Nisha TV
 Ahad TV
 Islam Channel Urdu
 British Muslim TV
 Islam TV Urdu
 Noor TV
 Iman - TV
 Imaan - TV
 Ahl - Al Quran TV
 Takbeer Tv
 Eman Channel
 Madani Channel
 Shia TV Online
 Safeer TV
 Peace TV
 Peace TV Urdu
 Peace TV Bangla
 Minhaj Ul Quran TV
 Iqra TV
 Iqraa TV
 Ummah Channel
 Ahle Bait TV
 Hidayat TV
 AL Qayim TV Network
 Zee Salaam
 Quran Tazkiah
 Al Athar TV
 Maaref tv
 4shbab Quran Al-Karem TV 
 Makkah TV / Channel
 Rodja TV
 Ammar TV / Channel
 Al Afasy Quran Channel
 Al Majd Hadith TV
 Al-Majd Quran TV
 Al-Majd Quran TV
 Tarawih TV
 Guide US TV
 4shbab TV2
 Al Hafez TV
 Al Nada TV
 Al Afasy TV
 Al-Ansar
 Al-Eman
 Al-Hekmah
 Al-Khalijiah
 Al-Ma3ali
 Al-Majd
 Al-Nas
 Al Rahmah TV
 Al-Rasheed
 Al-Resalah
 Al-Zaytouna TV
 Amgad TV
 Anasheed
 Bedaya
 Daleel
 Ibn Othaimeen TV
 Ibn Othaimeen TV
 Safaa
 Safaa
 Tayba
 Salaam TV
 Wesal TV
 AL-HIJRAH TV
 Noor TV
 Channel Islam international
 Makkah Live
 Madinah Live
 Quran TV Channel
 Madani Channel Live
 ARY QTV
 Durood TV
 Assalam TV
 AL Huda TV Channel
 Huda TV Channel
 Haq TV Network
 Muslim Ummah TV
 El-Quran El-Karim
 Buzzislam Radio: Listen Reflect Share
 Radio Quran
 Abu Dhabi Quran Kareem
 Voice of Islam
 Ummah FM
 [http:// Saudi Arabian Radio Quran]
 [http:// Holy Quran Radio 106.1]
 [http:// Radio Kuwait Quran Programme]
 [http:// Qatar Radio Holy Quran]
 H TV

Lists of British television channels
United Kingdom, Islamic
 
United Kingdom